Volutomitra pailoloana is a species of sea snail, a marine gastropod mollusk in the family Volutomitridae.

Description

Distribution

References

 Bouchet P.; Kantor Y. (2004). New Caledonia: the major centre of biodiversity for volutomitrid molluscs (Mollusca: Neogastropoda: Volutomitridae). Systematics and Biodiversity. 1(4): 467-502.
 Severns, M. (2011). Shells of the Hawaiian Islands - The Sea Shells. Conchbooks, Hackenheim. 564 pp.

External links
 Cate, J.M. (1963). Revision of Dall's Hawaiian mitrids with descriptions of three new species (Mollusca: Gastropoda). The Veliger. 6(1): 23-43, pls 5-8

Volutomitridae
Gastropods described in 1963